P'yŏnggang station is a railway station in P'yŏnggang-ŭp, P'yŏnggang county, Kangwŏn province, North Korea, on the Kangwŏn Line of the Korean State Railway. It is the terminus station of this line, although prior to the Korean War, the railway continued on to Sintal-li, which is nowadays the northern terminus of the Kyŏngwŏn Line in South Korea.

The station, along with the rest of the former Kyŏngwŏn Line, was opened by the Japanese on 16 August 1914.

References

Railway stations in North Korea
Railway stations opened in 1914